This article shows the rosters of all participating teams at the 2016 FIVB Volleyball Women's Club World Championship in Pasay, Philippines.

Pool A

PSL-F2 Logistics Manila
The following is the roster of the Filipino league team selection PSL-F2 Logistics Manila in the 2016 FIVB Volleyball Women's Club World Championship. 

Head coach:  Moro Branislav

Rexona-Sesc Rio
The following is the roster of the Brazilian club Rexona-Sesc Rio in the 2016 FIVB Volleyball Women's Club World Championship. 

Head coach:  Bernardo Rezende

Pomi Casalmaggiore
The following is the roster of the Italian club Pomi Casalmaggiore in the 2016 FIVB Volleyball Women's Club World Championship. 

Head coach:  Giovanni Caprara

Eczacıbaşı VitrA
The following is the roster of the Turkish club Eczacıbaşı VitrA İstanbul in the 2016 FIVB Volleyball Women's Club World Championship. 

Head coach:  Massimo Barbolini

Pool B

Hisamitsu Springs
The following is the roster of the Japanese club Hisamitsu Springs Kobe in the 2016 FIVB Volleyball Women's Club World Championship.
 Head coach:  Kumi Nakada

Bangkok Glass
The following is the roster of the Thai club Bangkok Glass in the 2016 FIVB Volleyball Women's Club World Championship.
 Head coach:  Kittipong Pornchartyingcheep

Vakıfbank İstanbul
The following is the roster of the Turkish club Vakıfbank İstanbul in the 2016 FIVB Volleyball Women's Club World Championship. 

 Head coach:  Giovanni Guidetti

Voléro Zürich
The following is the roster of the Switzerland's club Voléro Zürich in the 2016 FIVB Volleyball Women's Club World Championship.

Head coach:  Zoran Terzić

References

External links
Official website

2016 in volleyball
C